Bank of French Broad, also known as the Robert Building, is a historic bank building located at Marshall, Madison County, North Carolina.  The Bank of French Broad and adjacent Robert Building were designed by noted Asheville architect James J. Baldwin and built in 1922–1923. They are two- to three-story, Classical Revival style brick buildings.  The two buildings were joined into one building in the late 1970s to early 1980s.

It was listed on the National Register of Historic Places in 2004.  It is located in the Marshall Main Street Historic District.

References

Bank buildings on the National Register of Historic Places in North Carolina
Neoclassical architecture in North Carolina
Commercial buildings completed in 1923
Buildings and structures in Madison County, North Carolina
National Register of Historic Places in Madison County, North Carolina
Individually listed contributing properties to historic districts on the National Register in North Carolina